is an action-adventure game for the Wii console. It is a spin-off of Namco Bandai's successful Soulcalibur fighting game series and primarily features two of its most popular characters: Ivy and Siegfried.

Gameplay
The game features competitive and cooperative multiplayer modes in addition to the single player story mode.

Synopsis

Plot
The story of Soulcalibur Legends takes place between Soul Edge and Soulcalibur, and is based around Siegfried Schtauffen's transformation into Nightmare. The game begins as Siegfried finds Soul Edge on a ship. He battles Cervantes on the deck of the ship. Later, Siegfried is tasked by the Masked Emperor of the Holy Roman Empire to find the remaining pieces of Soul Edge in order to use it to win the war against Barbaros of the Ottoman Empire.

Characters

The game features seven playable characters: Siegfried, Ivy, Sophitia, Mitsurugi, Astaroth α (a prototype for the character in other games), Taki and Lloyd Irving, who is a guest character from Tales of Symphonia.

Marketing and release
Soulcalibur Legends was released on November 20, 2007 in North America, and was released in Japan on December 13, 2007. The game was eventually released in Europe, including the UK, on August 28, 2008.

A manga adaptation was published during the first year of the Japanese publication Kerokero Ace. The adaptation featured Siegfried, Iska and Ivy joining together on the main quest of the game. The adaptation's style was mostly comedic, including frequent 4-komas with running gags (such as Siegfried's annoyance that Ivy towered over him).

Reception 

Reviews for Soulcalibur Legends have been mixed. Metacritic lists the aggregate score for Soulcalibur Legends at 52/100. It scored far lower than the main series games and is the lowest selling of the series.

References

External links 
 

2007 video games
2008 video games
Ubisoft games
Action-adventure games
Cooperative video games
Bandai Namco games
Hack and slash games
Soulcalibur series games
Wii-only games
Video games developed in Japan
Video games featuring female protagonists
Video games scored by Masaharu Iwata
Video game spin-offs
Wii games